The 2019 NASCAR PEAK Mexico Series was the twelfth season of the NASCAR PEAK Mexico Series and the fifteenth season organized by NASCAR Mexico. It bean with the Gran Premio ARRIS at Autódromo Monterrey on 31 March and concluded at Autódromo Hermanos Rodríguez on 1 December. Rubén García Jr. defended his Drivers' champion.

Schedule
On 8 January 2019, NASCAR announced the 2019 schedule. The race in El Marqués and the second race in Aguascalientes will be held on the oval instead of the road course. On 16 January, it was announced that Monterrey, Guadalajara and the second race in Aguascalientes were moved one week. Several other date changes were made as well. Monterrey and the first Puebla event were joint races for the PEAK Mexico Series and the NASCAR FedEx Challenge Series, a PEAK Mexico support series in which competitors use similar cars, forming grids of over forty cars. Also has the NASCAR Mikel's Truck Series, the mexican version of NASCAR Gander Outdoors Truck Series as support of the PEAK Mexico Series.

Final standings

See also

2019 Monster Energy NASCAR Cup Series
2019 NASCAR Xfinity Series
2019 NASCAR Gander Outdoors Truck Series
2019 ARCA Menards Series
2019 NASCAR K&N Pro Series East
2019 NASCAR K&N Pro Series West
2019 NASCAR Whelen Modified Tour
2019 NASCAR Pinty's Series
2019 NASCAR Whelen Euro Series

References

External links

NASCAR PEAK Mexico Series
NASCAR PEAK Mexico Series